Hubbard Broadcasting, Inc. is an American television and radio broadcasting corporation based in St. Paul, Minnesota. It was founded by Stanley E. Hubbard.

The corporation has broadcast outlets scattered across Minnesota, Wisconsin, Missouri, Illinois, Ohio, New York, Texas, New Mexico, Arizona, Washington, Florida, and Washington, D.C. KSTP radio, KSTP-FM, KTMY, KSTP-TV, and KSTC-TV, which serve the Twin Cities region of Minnesota and western Wisconsin, are regarded as the company's legacy flagship stations.

History
KSTP has its origins in the Twin Cities radio station WAMD ("Where All Minneapolis Dances"), which started broadcasting live dance music from a local ballroom on February 13, 1925 with Stanley E. Hubbard as owner and station director. It was the first radio station to be completely supported by income generated by advertisements.

In 1928, WAMD merged with KFOY (Kind Friends of Yours) radio (first broadcast: March 12, 1924) in St. Paul to become KSTP, which was advertised as being operated by the National Battery Broadcasting Co. Hubbard became the merged station's general manager, and bought controlling interest in 1941. In 1938 Hubbard bought the first television camera available from RCA. Following the television blackout brought on by World War II, KSTP began television broadcasts in 1948.

KSTP is still Hubbard's flagship, although there are now three different stations that carry that name. KSTP (AM) broadcasts a sports radio format, and KSTP-FM broadcasts adult contemporary music; KSTP-TV is affiliated with ABC.

After the Federal Communications Commission relaxed rules about television station ownership, Hubbard bought a second television station in the Twin Cities. Originally affiliated with the Home Shopping Network when it started operations in 1994, KVBM was bought by Hubbard and became general-entertainment independent station KSTC-TV in 2000. It has been used as an alternate outlet for ABC network programming when KSTP-TV is broadcasting coverage of Minnesota Vikings football games or other special shows, including severe-weather coverage.

Aside from terrestrial broadcast stations, other current ventures include the film network ReelzChannel (launched in 2006), the arts network Ovation, and the Hubbard Radio Network, which is used to distribute KSTP's local talk shows to subscribing radio stations in Minnesota and Wisconsin. The cable channels are run through subsidiary company Hubbard Media Group.

In 1981, Hubbard Broadcasting started U.S. Satellite Broadcasting (USSB), and later was instrumental in the development and launching of the first digital satellite system for television in 1994. The new satellite could deliver 175 channels to a (at the time) tiny, 18 inch dish. USSB's development partner, Hughes Electronics (a General Motors subsidiary), launched its own subscription satellite service called DirecTV. The two services did not compete against each other (they carried different channels), and were often marketed together to subscribers by retailers and in advertisements, until DirecTV's 1998 acquisition of USSB.

Hubbard was also instrumental in the development of mobile satellite news vehicles. In 1983, Hubbard-owned CONUS Communications and Florida-based subsidiary Hubcom built the first Satellite News Gathering (SNG) mobile vehicle, which allowed for much easier live news coverage for network and local television news operations. This ultimately resulted in CONUS—later a joint-venture with Viacom—becoming a nationwide, satellite-based newsgathering cooperative (with Hubbard charging stations to relay their footage). As an outgrowth of this, Hubbard Broadcasting also operated a 24-hour news station, the All News Channel, which relied on CONUS-sourced news footage and primarily acted as a "sustaining feed" for television stations to fill air time with; ANC was also responsible for producing news programming for third-parties. The news channel lasted from 1989 until it folded in September 2002.

Hubbard Broadcasting also owned the now-closed Bound to be Read bookstores in St. Paul, Albuquerque, and Key Largo.

As of October 2007, it is engaged in a fevered battle with NABET union repping employees of WNYT in Albany, New York.

In June 2009, the "Society of Professional Journalists" honored Hubbard Broadcasting and KSTP-TV with its national Historical Site in Journalism award.

On January 19, 2011, Hubbard announced the purchase of 17 radio stations in Cincinnati, Chicago, Washington, D.C., and St. Louis from the Church of Jesus Christ of Latter-day Saints subsidiary Bonneville International for $505 million. The sale closed on April 29, 2011.

On February 25, 2013, Hubbard announced that it would purchase MyNetworkTV station WNYA to form a duopoly with WNYT, pending FCC approval. No financial details were announced.

On July 16, 2013, Hubbard announced that it had agreed to purchase 10 stations from Ohio-based Sandusky Radio for $85.5 million.

Hubbard announced on November 13, 2014 that it would purchase the sixteen stations owned by Omni Broadcasting. The Omni stations are all located in central and northern Minnesota.

On September 26, 2018, Hubbard announced that it agreed to purchase six stations owned by Alpha Media in West Palm Beach Florida, for $88 million. The stations include Urban AC 102.3 WMBX, Country 103.1 WIRK, Adult Contemporary 107.9 WEAT, Hot Adult Contemporary 97.9 WRMF, News/Talk 850 WFTL and Sports/Talk 640 WMEN.

Hubbard Broadcasting took over production of Country Top 40 in January 2020 after the death of the program's founder Bob Kingsley. Fitz, a mononymous host with several syndicated country radio programs to his credit, took over as the program's host.

Hubbard-owned stations 

Stations are arranged in alphabetical order by state and city of license.

All of the assets are owned by the Stanley S. Hubbard Revocable Trust, and administered by Hubbard Broadcasting, Inc.

(**) indicates a station that was built and signed-on by Hubbard.

Television stations

Radio stations

Cable channels (through Hubbard Media Group division)
 Ovation (purchased August 2006; co-owned with Bob and Harvey Weinstein and The Weinstein Company)
 Reelz (launched September 2006)

Former Hubbard-owned stations

Former television stations 

Hubbard also owned a partial stake in KWK-TV (later KMOX-TV, now KMOV), channel 4, in St. Louis during the mid-1950s.

Radio stations

Cable channels
 All News Channel (1989–2002, defunct)
 Prime Sports Upper Midwest (1989-95; joint venture with Liberty Media)

Notes

References

Further reading 
 Fulton Klinkerfues. Stanley E. Hubbard pioneered local broadcasting.  Good Age Newspaper.
 Jeff Miller (editor). A Chronology of AM Broadcasting (1900-1960).
 USA Today, June 11, 2006. 
 Los Angeles Times, August 30, 2006.

External links 
 Hubbard Broadcasting website

 
Companies based in Saint Paul, Minnesota
Radio in Minnesota
Television broadcasting companies of the United States
Television in Minnesota
Radio broadcasting companies of the United States
Mass media companies established in 1926
1926 establishments in Minnesota